Below is a list of episodes for the 1980s television sitcom Mama's Family.

Series overview

NBC Ratings

Episodes

Season 1 (1983)

Season 2 (1983–84)

Season 3 (1986–87)

Season 4 (1987–88)

Season 5 (1988–89)

Season 6 (1989–90)

References

External links
 
 

Lists of American sitcom episodes